2008 World Championships may refer to:

 Athletics: 2008 IAAF World Indoor Championships
Cross-country running: 2008 IAAF World Cross Country Championships
Half marathon: 2008 IAAF World Half Marathon Championships
 Bowls: World Bowls Championships 2008
 Chess: World Chess Championship 2008
 Curling:
 2008 Ford World Men's Curling Championship
 2008 World Women's Curling Championship
 Darts: 2008 BDO World Darts Championship
 Darts: 2008 PDC World Darts Championship
 Figure skating: 2008 World Figure Skating Championships
 Ice hockey: 2008 Men's World Ice Hockey Championships
 Ice hockey: 2008 Women's World Ice Hockey Championships
 Snooker: 2008 World Snooker Championship
 Speed skating:
Allround: 2008 World Allround Speed Skating Championships
Sprint: 2008 World Sprint Speed Skating Championships
Single distances: 2008 World Single Distance Speed Skating Championships

See also
 2008 World Cup (disambiguation)
 2008 Continental Championships (disambiguation)
 2008 World Junior Championships (disambiguation)